Maria de la Pau Janer (born 13 January 1966 in Majorca) is a writer from Spain who works in Spanish and Catalan. She is a recipient of the Premio Planeta de Novela and the Ramon Llull Novel Award.

She got her PhD degree at the University of the Balearic Islands. She is a member of the Associació d'Escriptors en Llengua Catalana. She was married to Joan Oliver Araujo. They divorced and then she married Joan Corbella. Her father, Gabriel Janer Manila, is also a well-known writer.

Works
L'hora dels eclipsis (1989), won Premi Andròmina
Màrmara (1993), won Premi Prudenci Bertrana
Natura d'anguila (1995), won Premi Carlemany
Orient, Occident (1997)
Lola (1999), won Premi Ramon Llull
Las mujeres que hay en mí (2002)
Pasiones romanas (2005), won Premio Planeta.

References

External links
https://web.archive.org/web/20051224014703/http://www.escriptors.com/autors/janermp/
http://www.epdlp.com/escritor.php?id=1856

Spanish women novelists
Majorcan writers
Short story writers from Catalonia
Catalan-language writers
1966 births
Living people
20th-century Spanish novelists
University of the Balearic Islands alumni
Spanish women short story writers
20th-century Spanish women writers
20th-century short story writers